A natural phenomenon is an observable event which is not man-made. Examples include: sunrise, weather, fog, thunder, tornadoes; biological processes, decomposition, germination; physical processes, wave propagation, erosion; tidal flow, and natural disasters such as electromagnetic pulses, volcanic eruptions, and earthquakes.

Physical phenomena 
The act of:
 Freezing
 Boiling
 Gravity
 Magnetism

Gallery

Chemical phenomena 
 Oxidation
 Fire
 Rusting

Biological phenomena
 Metabolism
 Catabolism
 Anabolism
 Decomposition – by which organic substances are broken down into a much simpler form of matter
 Fermentation – converts sugar to acids, gases and/or alcohol.
 Growth
 Birth
 Death
 Population decrease

Gallery

Astronomical phenomena
 Supernova
 Gamma ray bursts
 Quasars
 Blazars
 Pulsars
 Cosmic microwave background radiation.

Geological phenomena 

 Mineralogic phenomena
 Lithologic phenomena
 Rock types
 Igneous rock
 Igneous formation processes
 Sedimentary rock
 Sedimentary formation processes (sedimentation)
 Quicksand
 Metamorphic rock
 Endogenic phenomena
 Plate tectonics
 Continental drift
 Earthquake
 Oceanic trench
 Phenomena associated with igneous activity
 Geysers and hot springs
 Bradyseism
 Volcanic eruption
 Earth's magnetic field
 Exogenic phenomena
 Slope phenomena
 Slump
 Landslide
 Weathering phenomena
 Erosion
 Glacial and peri-glacial phenomena
 Glaciation
 Moraines
 Hanging valleys
 Atmospheric phenomena
 Impact phenomena
 Impact crater
 Coupled endogenic-exogenic phenomena
 Orogeny
 Drainage development
 Stream capture

Gallery

Meteorological phenomena 

Violent meteorological phenomena are called storms. Regular, cyclical phenomena include seasons and atmospheric circulation. climate change is often semi-regular.

Atmospheric optical phenomena

Oceanographic
 Oceanographic phenomena include tsunamis, ocean currents and breaking waves.

gallery

See also

 Act of God
 Electrical phenomena
 Materialism
 Midnight Sun
 Black Holes
 Natural Environment
 Nature
 Transient lunar phenomenon

References

Atmospheric optical phenomena
Earth phenomena
Geography terminology
Nature-related lists